İskender is the Turkish form of the name Alexander, after Alexander the Great, and may refer to:

People
 İskender Alın (born 1984), Turkish footballer
 İskender Köksal (born 1981), Turkish footballer
 Iskender Pasha (governor of Ozi) (fl. 1620), Ottoman military commander
 Iskender Pasha (governor of Egypt) (fl. 1555–1559), Ottoman governor of Egypt
 İskender Chitaşi (1904-1938) A  Laz Linguist, writer and activist
 Skanderbeg (1405–1468), Albanian hero, Ottoman military commander
 Alexander (son of Ivan Shishman) (died 1418), Bulgarian prince who converted to Islam

Other uses
 İskender kebap, Turkish dish invented by İskender Efendi
 Eskandar, East Azerbaijan, a village in East Azerbaijan Province, Iran
 İskender, Edirne

See also
 Iskandar
 Iskandar (disambiguation)
 Skanderbeg 

Turkish masculine given names